The 2019 Ohio Valley Conference women's basketball tournament ended the 2018–19 season of Ohio Valley Conference women's basketball. The tournament was held March 6–March 9 at Ford Center in Evansville, Indiana. Belmont won the championship, defeating UT Martin 59–53. Belmont's Jenny Roy was named tournament MVP.

Format
The OVC women's tournament is a traditional single-elimination tournament featuring the top eight teams in the conference regular-season standings. This differs from the format used in the OVC men's tournament; while that tournament also involves only eight of the league's 12 members, it has a radically different format, consisting of two stepladder brackets that produce the tournament finalists. The women's tournament is seeded so that the #8 seed faces the #1 seed in the first round, #7 faces #2, and so on. There is no reseeding, so if the #8 team were to defeat the #1 seed it would continue in the tournament playing the team which would have faced the #1 seed in the subsequent round (winner of #4 vs. #5).

Seeds

Bracket
 All times central.

References

Ohio Valley Conference women's basketball tournament
College basketball tournaments in Indiana
2018–19 Ohio Valley Conference women's basketball season
Basketball competitions in Evansville, Indiana
Women's sports in Indiana